Chen Shih-chieh (born 27 November 1989 in Pingtung, Taiwan, Republic of China) is a Taiwanese male weightlifter. At the 2012 Summer Olympics he competed for his country in the Men's +105 kg, finishing in 10th with a total of 418 kg. He earned a bronze medal at the 2014 Asian Games in the same event, lifting a combined 424 kg. The 191 kg Chen lifted in the snatch set a new Chinese Taipei record.  He was unable to finish the competition at the 2016 Olympics. In 2019 he tested positive for Testosterone and was banned until 2023 by the International Weightlifting Federation.

References

External links
 
 
 
 
 
 

1989 births
Living people
Taiwanese male weightlifters
Olympic weightlifters of Taiwan
Weightlifters at the 2012 Summer Olympics
Weightlifters at the 2016 Summer Olympics
Asian Games medalists in weightlifting
Asian Games bronze medalists for Chinese Taipei
Weightlifters at the 2010 Asian Games
Weightlifters at the 2014 Asian Games
Weightlifters at the 2018 Asian Games
Medalists at the 2014 Asian Games
Universiade medalists in weightlifting
Universiade silver medalists for Chinese Taipei
Paiwan people
People from Pingtung County
21st-century Taiwanese people